Lowell Eugene Killian (born September 22, 1952) is a former American football offensive guard in the National Football League (NFL) for the Dallas Cowboys. He played college football at the University of Tennessee.

Early years
Killian attended Brandon High School, where he practiced football and track.

He accepted a football scholarship from the University of Tennessee. As a junior, he was named a starter at offensive tackle.

As a senior, he was the starter at left tackle, before being lost for the season with a knee injury he suffered in the fourth game against the University of Kansas. He was replaced with Paul Johnson who was moved from center.

In track, he competed in the shot put.

Professional career

Dallas Cowboys
Killian was selected by the Dallas Cowboys in the 16th round (413th overall) of the 1974 NFL Draft. He was a backup offensive guard. He was considered to be a very good athlete, in the season finale against the Oakland Raiders, he tackled linebacker Phil Villapiano from behind, after he returned a Cowboys fumble 27 yards. He was waived on August 13, 1975.

San Diego Chargers
On August 13, 1975, he was claimed off waivers by the San Diego Chargers. On August 19, he was released after failing his physical examination.

New Orleans Saints
In 1976, he was signed as a free agent by the New Orleans Saints. He was released on September 7.

References

1951 births
Living people
People from Brandon, Florida
Players of American football from Florida
American football offensive guards
Tennessee Volunteers football players
Tennessee Volunteers men's track and field athletes
Dallas Cowboys players